Fatso is a 1980 American comedy-drama film written and directed by Anne Bancroft, her only such credit, and starring Dom DeLuise, Ron Carey and Candice Azzara. It was the first film produced by Mel Brooks's Brooksfilms company. The film examines the subject matter of obesity, addiction, family, self-acceptance and singlehood.

Plot
As the DiNapoli Antoinette (Anne Bancroft), Dominic (Dom DeLuise), and Frank Jr. (Ron Carey)are growing up, whenever young Dom was unhappy, the one thing his mother did to comfort him and make him feel cared for was to feed him something scrumptious. One example was Dom's mom giving her older son buttered bread after the boy got urinated on by his baby brother Frankie as the baby's diaper is being changed. Because of this, Dom grew up with a love of food, a trait shared by his equally obese cousin, Salvatore (Sal), who would often share his snacks with Dom.

When Sal suddenly dies at age 39, the family grieves. This prompts Antoinette to urge Dom to visit a diet doctor to avoid his cousin's unhealthy eating habits and not drive himself into an early grave as well. Dom agrees to do so once he recognizes signs that obesity is ruining his health. Dom is deeply disheartened when given his new diet plan, seeing the long list of delectable foods and dishes that he enjoys very much but now must avoid. When the diet fails, Dom's eating habits drive his sister crazy, so she enrolls him in the "Chubby Checkers" support group.

Meanwhile, Dom meets Lydia (Candice Azzara), a thin diabetic who owns the neighborhood antiques shop, and finds they have a lot in common outside of food. But being self-conscious about his body contours, he fears rejection, and can't bring himself to ask her for a date despite her obvious interest in him.

Dom had Frankie padlock the fridge and larder, but that proves to be little help because in the middle of the night, Dom, crazed by cravings for his favorite decadent delights (even having dreamed of marzipan candy), demands the keys from his brother, even threatening him with violence at one point, of which he is extremely ashamed afterward.

Now further depressed, Dom seeks comfort from his support group Chubby Checkers—calling Sonny and Oscar (Richard Karron and Paul Zegler) -- who turn out to be no help at all, as their reminiscing about favorite desserts and delicacies causes the intervention to deteriorate into the pig-out party to end all pig-out parties. Sonny even tears the pantry doors off their hinges.

To help their brother, Antoinette and Frankie bring together Dom and Lydia. While dating, Dom doesn't realize that he has been eating less and less, and is shocked to discover at how loosely his clothes fit in a matter of weeks.

Dom decides to propose to his lovely new sweetheart. When he drops by Lydia's apartment, she is gone. It worries him so much, he ends up eating all of the Chinese takeout food he was supposed to pick up for a family party. Antoinette finds out and attacks Dom with a doll mounted on a stick, and comments how he's hurting the family. Dom admits his acknowledgement of this, and starts to blame his mother for comforting him with food all his life. Antoinette learns this for the first time, and comforts him after a mental breakdown while he curses his mother. Dom notes Antoinette's revelation of his issues, and promises to keep trying. However, he also realizes that he must love himself the way he is, and makes the duo promise to do the same should he die of obesity like Sal, after which Antoinette and Frank learn to accept Dom for who he is. Dom then receives a phone call from Lydia, who is at a hospital in Boston visiting her younger brother, who accidentally chopped off a finger. Dom flies in and when the two take a walk through the hospital, watching the newborn babies in the nursery, Dom whispers his marriage proposal into Lydia's ear, and she accepts.

The film ends with a photo montage of now-married Dom and Lydia, then their babies — with each photo showing Lydia holding a new baby, while the previous child grows up. Dom's obesity only slightly declines through the years, but clearly exacts no toll upon the family's happiness.

Cast (in alphabetical order)

 Candice Azzara as Lydia Bollowenski
 Anne Bancroft as Antoinette Sosonna (née DiNapoli)
 Ron Carey as Frank "Frankie" DiNapoli, Jr.
 David Comfort as Anthony Sosonna
 Father Bob Curtis as Father Monohan
 Dom DeLuise as Dominic Anthony "Dom" DiNapoli
 Richard Karron as Sonny "Big Guy" Loffolotto
 Michael Lombard as Charlie Sosonna
 Ralph Manza as Danny
 Estelle Reiner as Mrs. Goodman
 Natasha Ryan as Ann Marie Sosonna
 Sal Viscuso as Vito (Dom's cousin)
 Paul Zegler as Oscar "Jew" Lapidus

Critical reception
The film has a rating of 33% on Rotten Tomatoes based on six reviews.

Many critics were very surprised by the effectively dramatic performances from actors, which have mostly been attributed to satiric or sophomoric comedy films in the past. Critic Peter Wu described the film as "A very humorous and yet serious movie about obesity," going on to write: "Maybe being overweight isn't the best thing for a person's health, but being one's self and being happy is all that really matters in life ... With a delightful blend of New York Italian culture and the human problem of overeating, Fatso makes for an entertaining movie experience. Loaded with some of the funniest comedy gags I have ever seen, Fatso is a very humorous and yet serious movie about a very touchy subject, Dom DeLuise!"

Other critics, such as Gene Siskel and Roger Ebert, were not as kind. Siskel called it "[an] emaciated script idea", "a major disappointment for Bancroft, who is making her directorial debut [and] an even bigger disappointment for this critic, who has been arguing for years that DeLuise is a gifted actor capable of playing leading roles." Ebert remarked that "two basic dramatic approaches to fatness are to regard it as comic, or tragic. Anne Bancroft has somehow avoided both approaches in 'Fatso,' a movie with the unique distinction of creating in its audiences an almost constant suspense about how they're supposed to be reacting. The movie itself just doesn't know: 'Fatso' has a director, a screenplay and a cast who are all uncertain about how they really feel about overweight." Another critical point of view said succinctly, "the biggest 
weight problem in the movie was the heavy hand of director Bancroft."

Impact
This film was also reviewed in the psychiatric monograph The Eating Disorders, which concluded that the film "... veers between comedy and pathos as a man discovers ... fat is the ... only sin in America." They approvingly note that, "The motivation for overeating and binge dieting are lampooned ... [and] medical consequences ... are elaborated in ... comedic fashion."

The film marked a turning point in the lives of actors Richard Karon and Paul Zegler who played DeLuise's obese "Chubby Checker" support group members. Both actors lost large amounts of weight in the years subsequent to the making of the film.

References

External links
 
 
 
 

1980 films
1980 romantic comedy films
20th Century Fox films
American romantic comedy films
American satirical films
Body image in popular culture
Brooksfilms films
Films about obesity
Films produced by Mel Brooks
Films set in New York City
Films shot in New York City
Films scored by Joe Renzetti
1980 directorial debut films
1980s English-language films
1980s American films